Edward Joseph Lucas Jr. (January 3, 1939 – November 10, 2021) was an American blind sportswriter who primarily covered the New York Yankees.

Biography
Born in Jersey City, New Jersey, Lucas grew up in Weehawken, New Jersey and attended St. Joseph's School for the Blind in Jersey City.
Lucas was blind from 1951, when he was 12 years old. He was pitching in a pickup game on October 3, 1951—the day of Bobby Thomson's "Shot Heard 'Round the World"— when a line drive hit him in the face. The accident resulted in the loss of his sight. From 1964, Lucas was a reporter and broadcaster.

He was an alumnus of Seton Hall University, having received a bachelor's degree in communication arts. In 2006, Lucas and his second wife, Allison Pfeifle, were the first couple to be married on the field of Yankee Stadium; they had been introduced to each other by Phil Rizzuto.

Lucas was featured in Bleacher Boys, a 2009 documentary about blind baseball fans, and in an April 2018 episode of SC Featured on ESPN.

A resident of Union Township, Union County, New Jersey, Lucas died from pulmonary fibrosis on November 10, 2021, at the age of 82.

Works

References

Further reading

External links 
 Ed Lucas Foundation
 

1939 births
2021 deaths
American male writers
American broadcasters
New York Yankees announcers
New York Mets announcers
American blind people
Seton Hall University alumni
Writers from Jersey City, New Jersey
People from Weehawken, New Jersey
People from Union Township, Union County, New Jersey